State Highway 33 (SH 33) is a State Highway in Kerala, India that starts in Thodupuzha and ends at Kumily road. The highway is 92.1 km long.

The Route Map 
Thodupuzha junction (SH 8) - Muttom - Kuruthikalam - Meenmutty - Painavu junction - Road to Idukki dam takes off - Kattappana junction - Puliyanmala - joins Munnar - Kumily road

See also 
Roads in Kerala
List of State Highways in Kerala

References 

State Highways in Kerala
Roads in Idukki district